Covenant Players (also known as CP) is a missions-based theater company, fielding touring troupes in over 30 countries, founded on September 29, 1963, and still operating .

It presents original Christian-themed plays written by founder Charles M. Tanner to schools, churches, hospitals, social service groups, the military, corporate, and community organizations.

The mission of Covenant Players is "to communicate the Lord Jesus Christ through the medium of drama" . 

CP's World Headquarters (aka WHQ) is located in Oxnard, California, and their North American Headquarters in Toledo, Ohio. Around 5 full-time performing units are supported by principal offices in Germany, Great Britain, Australia, New Zealand and South Africa. The Australian & New Zealand offices or South African Offices are no longer operating . Members are currently drawn from some two dozen nationalities.

Founder Charles M. Tanner died on March 11, 2006, after years of declining health following a massive stroke in 1998; Bobbi Johnson-Tanner became International Director.

References

External links
http://www.covenantplayers.org

Theatre companies in California
Christian theatre companies